Heinz Schenker (born 26 July 1943) is a Swiss bobsledder who competed in the early 1970s. He won a silver medal in the two-man event at the 1973 FIBT World Championships in Lake Placid, New York.

Schenker also competed at the 1972 Winter Olympics in Sapporo, finishing fourth in the four-man event and seventh in the two-man event.

References

External links
Bobsleigh two-man world championship medalists since 1931
Wallenchinsky, David (1984). "Bobsled". In The Complete Book of the Winter Olympics: 1896 - 1980. New York: Penguin Books. pp. 559, 561.

1943 births
Living people
Swiss male bobsledders
Bobsledders at the 1972 Winter Olympics
Olympic bobsledders of Switzerland